Slacker rock is a loosely defined genre of rock music and lo-fi music that originated in the United States in the late 1980s and early 1990s.

Definition
The term typically refers to a style that is more laid back and relaxed when compared to regular and contemporary rock in order to make it more "authentic" when compared to other rock.

History
Slacker rock is closely related to "slacker" culture that arose in the 1980s and 1990s with Generation X and can be seen in the way the music is composed with less emphasis on playing certain notes correctly, having slightly out of tune instruments, and having lyrics be sung in a form that was more relaxed similar to the slacker style. The image of the genre is that of a cool laziness or mellow swagger which came as a result from artists in the genre wanted to detached themselves from the "sellout" culture of other rock genres.

Taking influence from 1980s lo-fi bands like Beat Happening and Tall Dwarfs, slacker rock was pioneered by indie rock acts including Sebadoh, Pavement, Sparklehorse and Guided By Voices, among others. The genre saw its height in the 1990s with popular artists like Beck. Since the 2010s, it has seen a revival with the likes of Mac DeMarco, Alex G and Courtney Barnett.

References 

 
 
21st-century music genres
1990s in music
2000s in music
Lo-fi music
Generation X